Benjamin Wood may refer to:
 Benjamin Wood (American politician) (1820–1900), U.S. Representative from New York and publishing entrepreneur
 Benjamin Wood (MP) (1787–1845), British Whig politician
 Benjamin Wood (cricketer) (born 1971), English cricketer
 Benjamin D. Wood (1894–1986), American educator, researcher, and director
 Benjamin T. Wood, American architect
 Ben Wood (born 1980), British visual artist